Charalampos Mavrias (born 21 February 1994), known as "Charis" or "Harry", is a Greek professional footballer who plays as a right back and right midfielder for Apollon Limassol and Greece national team.

Club career

Panathinaikos
Mavrias joined Panathinaikos' youth academy in 2007, aged 13, and was promoted to the first-team squad in 2010, after signing a professional contract in the previous year. On 20 October 2010 he made his first-team – and UEFA Champions League – debut, playing the last 12 minutes of a 0–0 home draw against Rubin Kazan, thus becoming the youngest Greek ever to appear in the competition, and the second youngest overall (only behind Celestine Babayaro, being surpassed later by Alen Halilović, Youri Tielemans and Rayan Cherki). Four days later he made his league debut, again as a substitute in a 0–1 loss at AEK.

Mavrias scored his first professional goal on 18 February 2012, netting his side's last of a 2–0 success at Ergotellis; he scored his first European goal on 31 July 2012, again netted the last of a 2–0 win at Motherwell in the first leg of the third qualifying round of the Champions League, one minute after coming onto the pitch as a substitute.

Sunderland
On 22 August 2013, Mavrias joined English Premier League side Sunderland on a four-year contract, for an undisclosed fee, rumoured to be £2-3 million. However, he was left out of the squad to play Southampton due to lack of match fitness.

Mavrias made his debut five days later, coming on as a second-half substitute in a 4–2 home success over Milton Keynes Dons, for the campaign's Football League Cup. He scored his first goal on 25 January of the following year, netting the winner against Kidderminster Harriers in the fourth round of the FA Cup.

On 2 February 2015, it was confirmed Mavrias had joined his former club Panathinaikos on loan until the end of the 2014–15 season.

Mavrias returned to Sunderland where he has been training and playing for the Black Cats Under-21s – and is understood to have impressed the club's coaching staff with his attitude and contribution. But Mavrias has not come close to being included in the first-team squad, however is not bitter over seeing his career stall on Wearside. “I took the decision to leave Panathinaikos and go to Sunderland, and I think anyone in my position would take this decision,” he told the Greek press. On 9 January 2016, almost two years after his last match with the first team, Mavrias entered the game in second half as a substitute in a 3–1 away loss against Arsenal for FA Cup.

Fortuna Düsseldorf
He was loaned to Fortuna Düsseldorf on 27 January 2016.
Mavrias - who has 18 months remaining on his Sunderland contract - now has a chance to play regular first-team football after joining Düsseldorf until the end of the campaign, with a view to a permanent switch next summer. On 6 February 2016, he made his debut with a club, in a 0–1 home loss against Heidenheim.

Mavrias performance in Düsseldorf was satisfying, leading the club to set an offer for the Greek international winger. Unfortunately on 24 June 2016, Sunderland reject Fortuna Düsseldorf's lower bid than the £400,000 clause to convert the loan into a permanent switch.

Karlsruher SC
On 6 September 2016, after three seasons spent playing for Sunderland, only 7 official caps overall collected as a Black Cats man, plus 2 experiences as a loanee (at Fortuna Düsseldorf and Panathinaikos), he joined 2. Bundesliga side Karlsruher SC for a three-years contract. On 10 September 2016, he made his debut with the club in a 4–0 away loss against Union Berlin. Unfortunately, KSC harboured hopes of promotion back to the Bundesliga this summer, after finishing seventh last term had erupted during the year as the club relegated to Germany's third tier.

Rijeka
On 24 August 2017, Mavrias joined Rijeka in the Croatian First Football League on a one-year contract with a three-year extension option.

Hibernian
Mavrias signed with Scottish Premiership club Hibernian in October 2018 on a short-term contract, following a trial period. He made two first-team appearances for Hibernian, but then suffered a hamstring injury and was released at the end of his contract.

Omonia
On 29 December 2018, Omonia officially announced the signing of Mavrias on a 2,5 year contract. He made his debut for the team on 13 January 2019, on a match against Apollon Limassol for the Cypriot First Division, replacing Saša Živec on the 41st minute. On February 10, he scored his first goal on a match against Doxa Katokopias.

Apollon Limassol
On 11 June 2021, Apollon Limassol announced him, with a contract lasting until 2023.

International career
On 19 March 2019, Greece head coach Angelos Anastasiadis announced the call up of Mavrias for the match against Liechtenstein and Bosnia and Herzegovina for UEFA Euro 2020. Mavrias's talent is undoubted and has added versatility to his game, demonstrating he is able to operate as a right back if need be. His form in Cyprus has been patchy which again makes his selection fascinating. Anastasiadis may see him as a ‘wildcard’ option to throw on off the bench as his speed could add another dimension to a team severely lacking such a trait. He has already featured for the Greece national team on five occasions, but his last appearance came in 2014 as the Greece lost to Serbia in a friendly.

Career statistics

Honours

Club
Rijeka
Atlantic Cup: 2017

Omonia
Cypriot First Division: 2020–21

Apollon Limassol
Cypriot First Division: 2021–22

International
Greece U19
UEFA European Under-19 Championship runner-up: 2012

References

External links
 
 
 
 
 
 Charis Mavrias at SkySports
 
 

1994 births
Living people
People from Zakynthos
Association football midfielders
Greek footballers
Greece youth international footballers
Greece under-21 international footballers
Greece international footballers
Panathinaikos F.C. players
Super League Greece players
Sunderland A.F.C. players
Premier League players
Fortuna Düsseldorf players
Karlsruher SC players
2. Bundesliga players
HNK Rijeka players
Croatian Football League players
Expatriate footballers in England
Expatriate footballers in Germany
Expatriate footballers in Croatia
Greek expatriate footballers
Greek expatriate sportspeople in Croatia
Hibernian F.C. players
Expatriate footballers in Scotland
Scottish Professional Football League players
Sportspeople from the Ionian Islands (region)